The West Virginia Mountaineers men's soccer team is the  National Collegiate Athletic Association Division I soccer team of West Virginia University (WVU). Beginning with the 2012 season, the team was an affiliate member of the Mid-American Conference because WVU is the only school in its primary conference, the Big 12 Conference, that has a varsity men's soccer team. For the 2022 season, West Virginia joined in-state rival Marshall in the Sun Belt Conference, and the Mountain State Derby will become an annual conference game.  WVU had been scheduled to leave the MAC for Conference USA but this plan was changed when Marshall changed conferences from CUSA to the SBC.

Coaching staff
Source: 

 Head coach – Dan Stratford 
 Associate Head Coach – Andy Wright (7th season)
 Assistant – Nick Noble (5th season)
 Strength Coach –  Tanner Kolb (6th season)
 Athletic Trainer – Ethan Solger

Conference membership
Source:=
1961–1965 — Southern Conference member, soccer Independent
1966–1967 — Southern Conference (SoCon had no regular season play at that time, only a conference tournament)
1968–1975 — Independent
1976–1986 — Atlantic 10 Conference member, soccer Independent
1987–1994 — Atlantic 10 Conference
1995–2011 — Big East Conference (original)
2012–2021 — Big 12 Conference member, Mid-American Conference affiliate in soccer
2022–present — Big 12 Conference member, Sun Belt Conference affiliate in soccer

(NOTE: Prior to 1972, the NCAA sponsored only one championship in men's soccer. In 1972, the NCAA began sponsoring a championship in the College Division, which in turn was split into today's Divisions II and III in 1973. The 1972 College Division Tournament was retroactively considered to be the first D-II championship event. WVU remained in competition in the University Division, which was renamed Division I in 1973, and has remained in D-I to this day.)

All-Americans 
Source:=
 1967 — Ron McEachen, Defender;  NSCAA 1st Team 
 1967 — Walt Nistorenko, Forward; NSCAA 3rd Team 
 1968 — Walt Nistorenko, Forward; NSCAA 1st Team 
 1968 — Pat Sullivan, Defender; NSCAA 1st Team 
 1981 — Jon Capon, Goalkeeper; NSCAA 1st Team 
 2006 — Nick Noble, Goalkeeper; NSCAA 1st Team; College Soccer News 2nd Team 
 2006 — Jarrod Smith, Forward; College Soccer News 1st Team; Soccer America 1st team 
 2007 — Andy Wright, Midfielder; NSCAA 3rd Team; College Soccer News 2nd Team; Soccer America 2nd team 
 2010 — Raymon Gaddis, Defender; Top Drawer Soccer 3rd Team
 2011 — Eric Schoenle, Defender; NSCAA 3rd Team 
 2012 — Eric Schoenle, Defender; Top Drawer Soccer 3rd Team

Record by year

References

External links
 

 
1961 establishments in West Virginia
Association football clubs established in 1961